An aracari or araçari (
)
is any of the medium-sized toucans that, together with the saffron toucanet, make up the genus Pteroglossus.

They are brightly plumaged and have enormous, contrastingly patterned bills. These birds are residents in forests and woodlands in the Neotropics.

Taxonomy
The genus Pteroglossus was introduced in 1811 by the German zoologist Johann Karl Wilhelm Illiger. The name combines the Ancient Greek pteron meaning "feather" with glōssa meaning "tongue". George Robert Gray designated the black-necked aracari as the type species of the genus in 1840.

The name "Aracari" was used in 1648 by the German naturalist Georg Marcgrave for the  black-necked aracari in his book Historia Naturalis Brasiliae. The name comes from the word Arassari, the name of the bird in the Tupi language.

One species, the distinctive saffron toucanet, was formerly placed in the monotypic genus Baillonius, but Renato Kimura and collaborators showed in 2004 that it belongs in the genus Pteroglossus.

A 2010 molecular phylogenetic study by Swati Patel and collaborators found that the brown-mandibled aracari was nested with the subspecies of the ivory-billed aracari:

Extant species
Fourteen species are considered to belong to the genus Pteroglossus:

Former species
Some authorities, either presently or formerly, recognize additional species or subspecies as species belonging to the genus Pteroglossus including:
 Wagler's toucanet (as Pteroglossus wagleri)
 Emerald toucanet (as Pteroglossus prasinus)
 White-throated toucanet (as Pteroglossus albivitta)
 Black-throated toucanet (as Pteroglossus atrogularis)
 Groove-billed toucanet (as Pteroglossus sulcatus)
 Crimson-rumped toucanet (as Pteroglossus haematopygus)
 Guianan toucanet (as Pteroglossus Culik)
 Golden-collared toucanet (as Pteroglossus reinwardtii)
 Langsdorff's toucanet (as Pteroglossus langsdorffii)
 Tawny-tufted toucanet (as Pteroglossus nattereri)
 Gould's toucanet (as Pteroglossus gouldii)
 Spot-billed toucanet (as Pteroglossus maculirostris)
 Gray-breasted mountain toucan (as Pteroglossus hypoglaucus)
 Hooded mountain toucan (as Pteroglossus cucullatus)
 Black-billed mountain toucan (as Pteroglossus nigrirostris)

Behaviour and ecology
Some species of aracaris are unusual for toucans in that they roost socially throughout the year, up to six adults and fledged young sleeping in the same hole with tails folded over their backs.

Breeding
They are arboreal and nest in tree holes laying 2–4 white eggs.

Food and feeding
All the species are basically fruit-eating, but will take insects and other small prey.

Threats
The ischnoceran louse Austrophilopterus flavirostris is suspected to parasitize most if not all species of aracaris, with the possible exception of the green aracari (Price & Weckstein 2005).

References

Price, Roger D. & Weckstein, Jason D. (2005): The genus Austrophilopterus Ewing (Phthiraptera: Philopteridae) from toucans, toucanets, and araçaris (Piciformes: Ramphastidae). Zootaxa 918: 1–18. PDF fulltext

 
Toucans